The  also known as simply the JFL is the 4th tier of the Japanese association football league system, positioned beneath the three divisions of the J.League. The league features fully professional teams that hold J.League associate membership among its ranks.

Relationship and position of J. League and Japan Football League (JFL)
According to the official document published in December 2013 when the J3 League was established, the J3 League was the 3rd level of the J.League. The J.League and non-J.League amateur leagues have different hierarchical structures, and the J3 League was ranked on the same level as the JFL.  In addition, the JFL itself has the same recognition in the material showing the league composition on the official website. Therefore, the JFL is treated as equal to J3 in theory, but in practice it is considered equivalent to a 4th division.

History

The Japan Football League started from the 1999 season when the second division of J.League (J2) was also born. Until then, J.League consisted of only one division and the former JFL was the second highest division. Out of 16 teams who played the last season of the former JFL, 9 decided and were accepted to play in J2 and the other 7 teams as well as Yokogawa Electric, the winners of the Regional League Promotion Series, formed the new Japan Football League. These 8 teams together with Yokohama FC that was allowed to participate as a special case after the merger of Yokohama Flügels and Yokohama Marinos competed in the inaugural 1999 season.

The 9 teams that competed in the first season were as follows: Denso SC, Honda Motors, Jatco SC, Kokushikan University F.C., Mito HollyHock, Otsuka Pharmaceuticals, Sony Sendai,  Yokohama FC and Yokogawa Electric.

In the second season the number of clubs was increased from 9 to 12, reaching 16 in 2001. In 2002 it was briefly 18 clubs before going back to 16 the next season and settling for good at 18 in 2006. For the 2012 season it had 17 clubs due to the late withdrawal of Arte Takasaki.

The league suffered another contraction after 2013 season, as 10 of its 18 teams joined the newly created J3 League. It also moved a tier down the pyramid, making it fourth-tier league since 2014.

Four former JFL clubs have competed in the top flight: Yokohama FC (2007, 2021 & 2023), Otsuka Pharmaceuticals (2014 & 2021 as Tokushima Vortis), Matsumoto Yamaga (2015 & 2019), and V-Varen Nagasaki (2018).

Overview
JFL clubs may be affiliated to companies, or be entirely autonomous clubs or reserve teams of these. Until 2010, university clubs (which as a rule do not play in the Japanese football league system) were recommended by the Japan University Football Association and played off against bottom JFL teams for entrance. B-teams are allowed to participate but only A-squads of truly autonomous clubs are eligible for J.League associate membership, and with it, promotion to J.League.

Promotion from JFL
A club that satisfies the following criteria will be promoted to J.League Div. 2 (for the 2012 and 2013 seasons):
 Have J.League associate membership
 Finish the season in the top two in JFL
If only the champion is an associate member, it will be automatically promoted.
If both the champion and runner-up are associate members, the champion will be automatically promoted and the runner-up will play a promotion/relegation Series against the second-to-last club in the J2.
If only the runner-up is an associate member, it will play the promotion/relegation Series against the last club in the J2.
 Pass the final inspection by the J.League Committee.

With the establishment of the J3 League in the 2014 season, the top 2 requirements are no longer necessary should a team that is approved by J.League Committee and is a J.League associate member. However, they start in the J3 instead. The JFL is the highest tier of amateur level football in Japan again, but they still serve the purpose of helping potential J.League clubs to participate in the J3.

At a J.League board meeting in August 2021, 60 clubs, of which 20 are J3, were targeted for the entire league, and a possibility that J3 will have exceeded 20 clubs by the 2023 season was brought up. Mitsuru Murai, the J.League chairman, revealed that he was discussing how to adjust to 20 clubs. At this time, he was asked, "If there is a possibility of the [J3] league having 21 teams, is it okay to understand that there are teams that will fall from J3 to JFL?" While under consideration, he admitted that the J3 and JFL were considering the introduction of relegation to the latter league as early as after the 2022 season. Later in November, Murai announced that promotion from and relegation to the JFL had been planned for the end of 2023.

In early January 2023, the J.League introduced the J3–JFL promotion/relegation playoffs, enabling the possibility for teams to be relegated from the J3. The system of promotion and relegation between the J3 and the JFL can be determined by the eligibility (promotion to J3 requires a J.League license) of the JFL's champions and runners-up for the season.

If only the JFL champions hold a license, they replace automatically the J3's 20th-placed team.
If only the JFL runners-up hold a license, there are promotion/relegation playoffs with the J3's 20th-placed team.
If both the JFL champions and runners-up hold a license, there will be automatic exchange between the JFL champions and the J3's 20th-placed team, and the runners-up compete in two-legged playoffs with the J3's 19th-placed team.
If both the JFL champions and runners-up do not hold a license, no exchange takes place; the teams placed third and below in the league standings, even if one of them holds a J3 license, are not entitled to promotion and the playoffs.

Relegation from JFL

The team at the bottom of the league will face a direct relegation, exchanging its place with Regional League promotion competition winner, with the team ranked 15th playing the relegation/promotion play-off against the team finishing second in that competition. The number of teams relegated varies depending on the outcome of the play-off or the number of teams withdrawn from the JFL.

Emperor's Cup eligibility

Until 2008, only the club at the top of the standings at half-season (17 matches completed) was qualified for the Emperor's Cup, entering it at the third round along with the clubs in J2, but the allotment was widened to the top three clubs in 2010 due to the expansion of J2. Every other club must qualify through a qualifying cup in their own prefecture and then must enter at the first round.
In 2015, only the winner of the apertura (first half) qualified.

JFL XI

In 1999 (Bangabandhu Cup) and since 2014, a JFL XI team has played off-season matches against guest teams. The 2016 season also featured an JFL East vs JFL West all-star encounter.

2023 season

Competition format
The league follows a one-stage double round-robin, wherein the team finishing at the top of the table following the season is declared the champion. From 2014 to 2018 it used the Apertura and Clausura system, with two winners of each stage contesting the championship in the playoff. From 2019 it used the single table with double round-robin system to 30 matches (28 matches for 2023).

Participating clubs

Pink background denotes clubs that were most recently promoted from Japanese Regional Leagues through the Regional League promotion tournament.
"Qualifiable base for J.League" indicates the club holds a J3 League license. Clubs who actually hold the license are denoted in bold.
Formerly, clubs who wished to join the J.League had to also acquire a 100 Year Plan status membership. The J.League decided that from 2023, it would not be necessary for a club to hold this status in order to enable their promotion.

Stadiums (2023) 

Primary venues used in the JFL:

Former clubs

Pink background denotes clubs that were most recently promoted to J3 League.

Championship, promotion and relegation history

Most successful clubs
Clubs in bold compete in JFL as of 2023 season. Clubs in italic no longer exist.

Third-tier league: 1999–2013

Fourth-tier league: 2014–
From 2014 to 2018 the Japan Football League switched to the Apertura and Clausura format to determine the champions. In 2019 the single-table format returned.

JFL records and statistics
.
In bold the ones who are actually playing in JFL. In italic the ones who are still active in other league.

See also

 Sport in Japan
 Football in Japan
 Women's football in Japan
 Japan Football Association (JFA)

 Soccer/Football
 League system
 Japanese association football league system
 J.League
 J1 League (Tier 1)
 J2 League (Tier 2)
 J3 League (Tier 3)
 Japan Football League (JFL) (Tier 4)
 Regional Champions League (Promotion playoffs to JFL)
 Regional Leagues (Tier 5/6)

 Domestic cup
 Fujifilm Super Cup (Super Cup)
 Emperor's Cup (National Cup)
 J.League YBC Levain Cup (League Cup)

 Futsal
 F.League
 F1 League (Tier 1)
 F2 League (Tier 2)
 JFA Futsal Championship (National Cup)
 F.League Ocean Cup (League Cup)

 Beach soccer
 Beach Soccer Championship (National Cup)

References

External links
 Official website 
 JFL Official Channel 
 2010 JFL season 

 
4
Fourth level football leagues in Asia
Semi-professional sports leagues
Sports leagues established in 1999
1999 establishments in Japan